Feltz is a surname. Notable people with the surname include:

 Eberhard Feltz (born 1937), German violinist
 Kurt Feltz (1910–1982), German poet
 Vanessa Feltz (born 1962), English journalist and radio presenter